A hanap is an obsolete, Norman-French term for a large drinking goblet, made of precious material such as gold or silver, and used especially on state occasions.

In Literature
1. Old London Silver, Its History, Its Makers and Its Marks by Montague Howard (1903)
"hanap or Standing Cup (1616) Height, 25 inches At St. John's College, Cambridge A radical departure was made in the form of the standing cup of the second ..."

2. Proceedings and Ordinances of the Privy Council of England by Great Britain Privy Council, Harris Nicolas, Great Britain, Nicholas Harris Nicolas, Great Britain Record Commission, England and Wales Privy Council (1834)
"Item un autre hanap dargent par tout ... It j. autre hanap dargent playne ove j. tayle entour le ..."

3. Notes and Queries by Martim de Albuquerque (1850)
"The hanap frequently occurs in wills and inventories of the thirteenth, fourteenth, and fifteenth centuries. In the will of Lady Clare, 1355*,— "Je devise a ..."

Resources

 http://www.lexic.us/definition-of/hanap

See also
Hanaper

References 

Containers